The Mitsubishi Colt Galant GTO (Gran Turismo Omologato) was first shown as the Galant GTX-1 showcar at the 1969 Tokyo Motor Show. Sales began in November 1970, when it was the flagship hardtop variant of Mitsubishi Heavy Industries's then-new Colt Galant sedan. The nameplate was revived in 1990 for the Mitsubishi GTO, although this name was only used in the Japanese domestic market.

History
The Colt Galant GTO exterior was penned by Hiroaki Kamisago, who had previously been sent by Mitsubishi to study at the Art Center College of Design, then located in Los Angeles, California. The design incorporates a number of stylistic cues from contemporary American muscle cars such as the Mustang, Firebird and Cougar, including a long hood, raised cut-off ducktail rear, and rounded quad-headlamps and tail-lamps. The GTO was Mitsubishi's second production car to have full, roll down, side windows and a pillarless design and after the Toyota T40 series Corona of 1966 and Mitsubishi's own Galant Hardtop launched earlier in 1970; the GTO was the third such Japanese car.

Mitsubishi Racing Development (AKA Colt Speed) intended for the Colt Galant GTO to compete in the prestigious JCCA Grand Prix circuit. However, the OPEC oil embargo of 1973 sounded the demise of GP racing, so the GTO race program was mothballed. Nevertheless, GTO's were successful in rallying, including the famous Japanese Alpine Rally.

Initially, there were three Colt Galant GTO (A53C) models offered, all powered by the Saturn engine: the M1 (1600 cc SOHC, 4-speed single carb), the M2 (1600 cc SOHC, 4-speed, using twin Mikuni-built Solex carburetors for a total of 110 hp)(SAE).and the top-spec MR (1600 cc twin-carb, DOHC five-speed), a  version only available in Japan.

In February 1972 Mitsubishi upgraded the power plants, replacing the lower powered versions with a somewhat larger (1.7 litre) version of the Saturn engine. These cars received the A55C chassis code, while the twin-cam MR continued to use the smaller but more powerful 4G32 engine until January 1973, when stricter emissions standards made it obsolete. The higher-end versions then received Mitsubishi's all new Astron engine, with either , along with a new A57C chassis code. The range now consisted of the SL (2000 cc single-carb, four- or five-speed manual or automatic transmission), GS-5 (2000 cc twin-carb, 5-speed manual) and GSR (2000 cc twin-carb, five-speed manual). The lineup was also given a mild facelift to signal the changes, comprising a one-piece slats-type grille with a central dividing molding and three-piece tail lights. Additionally, the more sporting GSR had wider 185-section tires, flared guards and a black-painted rear panel between the lights.

There were some minor adjustments to safety equipment in October 1973, and the automatic transmissions were dropped in August 1974. This was followed by a second styling tweak in February 1975 when the car gained a honeycomb-style front grille, enough to be labelled the "New Galant GTO" in promotional material. Two-litre GTOs built after this date also gained the Astron 80 engine with Mitsubishi's Silent Shaft system, while the four-speed manual transmission was now only available with the smallest engine. In October 1975 the engines were updated with Mitsubishi's MCA emissions control system with an exhaust gas recirculation valve and a thermal reactor, all to pass the upcoming 1976 emissions standards. The four-speed transmission was discontinued entirely at this time, leaving only five-speed manuals.

Three months later the entire range received some minor exterior modifications, with the GSR receiving a new, large front air dam with a mirrored "GSR" script. After a relatively long production run, the GTO was finally replaced by Galant Lambda/Sapporo in December 1976, although production continued into 1977.

Export
Mitsubishi chose not to aggressively export the Colt Galant GTO. Besides the home market of Japan, few examples (all right hand drive) were sold abroad. Most were distributed to New Zealand, and smaller numbers ended up in various Asian countries including Papua New Guinea. It was also exported to the United Kingdom and Ireland between January 1975 and late 1976. Retailing at almost £3,000 (£600 more than a Celica GT coupé) it failed make a UK market impact. At the time, Mitsubishi rarely used their own brand name abroad, so all were sold simply as the "Colt Galant GTO". In Japan, the few remaining good examples have reached "collector" money status, recent examples at auction have commanded over ¥1,000,000, with MR variants reaching almost twice that amount.

GTO name revived
After Colt Galant GTO production ceased in 1977, the name lay dormant for 13 years, but it retained sufficient cachet that Mitsubishi resurrected it for their flagship Mitsubishi GTO sports GT in 1990. However, in order to avoid offending automotive connoisseurs, who might have objected to the evocative nameplate from the highly regarded Ferrari 250 GTO (1962), and Pontiac GTO being used on a Japanese vehicle, it was sold as the Mitsubishi 3000GT in overseas markets.

References

Coupés
Galant GTO
Rear-wheel-drive vehicles
Sports cars
Cars introduced in 1970
Cars discontinued in 1977